Bryan Patrick Beirne (22 January 1918 – 31 March 1998) was an Irish entomologist who emigrated to Canada in 1949. He specialized in pest management.

Born in Rosslare, County Wexford, Beirne's interest in entomology began when he collected caterpillars and released them as butterflies.

A student at Blackrock College in Blackrock, County Dublin, Beirne was uninterested in most subjects and even less interested in sport. He later claimed to have perfected the art of "running away from a ball while seeming to run towards it."

At the age of 16, Beirne entered the University of Dublin (Trinity College) where he devised his own course of studies and received his Ph.D. at age 22. He held the prestigious Overseas Scholarship of the Royal Commission for the Exhibition of 1851, before becoming a full-time member of the faculty of Trinity College in 1943, at the age of 25. He received an appointment as Senior Entomologist for the Canadian Government in Ottawa in 1949, and in 1955 was appointed director of the research of the Research Institute for Biological Control in Belleville, Ontario.

In 1967, he led seven of his scientific colleagues to Simon Fraser University in Burnaby, British Columbia where they established the Pestology Centre, the first structured professional program leading to the then-novel degree of Master in Pest Management (MPM). At SFU Dr. Beirne also served as Dean of Graduate Studies and Emeritus Professor of Pest Management. After his retirement in 1983, he maintained close ties with the university and energetically involved himself in innovative business enterprises in pest control and in research on the histories of pest control in both Canada and Ireland. Dr. Beirne was elected a member of the Royal Irish Academy in 1944. He was the recipient of many honours and awards including the gold medal of the Entomological Society of Canada and the Career Achievement Award of the Science Council of British Columbia.. He lectured in more than 20 countries, published over 15 books and more than 120 scientific research papers. The insect genus Beirneola was named after him as were a number of insect species. He discovered and named more than 30 previously unknown species. His career accomplishments were great and provide on-going benefit. More important still was his positive influence on family, friends, students and colleagues.

He died in Burnaby, British Columbia in 1998.

He has been memorialised at Simon Fraser University with the "B.P. Beirne Prize in Pest Management." He will be remembered by his clansmen for his book, "The Family O'Beirne," published in 1997 and as the inspiration for "The O'Beirne Family Journal," first published January 1998.

Works
 The genitalia of the British Rhopalocera and the larger moths by F.N. Pierce & B.P. Bierne. Publ. F.N. Pierce (1941)
 The Origin and History of British Fauna  Methuen (1952)
British Pyralid and Plume Moths Frederick Warne (1952)
Pest Management  London: Leonard Hill (1966)
Irish Entomology. Irish Naturalists' Journal Special Issue (1985)
Beirne also published important faunal lists of Lepidoptera and taxonomic works on both Lepidoptera and Hymenoptera

External links
Short Biography and Chronology of Beirne
Profile Science Canada

1918 births
1998 deaths
Irish emigrants to Canada
Irish entomologists
Irish lepidopterists
Hymenopterists
People educated at Blackrock College
People from County Wexford
20th-century Irish zoologists
20th-century Canadian zoologists